Gulleiv Wee (born 8 October 1969 in Sandnes, Norway) is a Norwegian musician (bass), known from collaborations in the Norwegian band The September When.

Career 
After "The September When" broke up in 1996, Wee started the band "Janne Hagens Gospel Combo", "Dream Pilots" (2004–), "Salvation Street" and Wibutee (2000–01). He played once in an orchestra "Circulasione Totale Orchestra". He has been a central figure on the Norwegian music scene for more than two decades.

Selected discography 

Within The September When
1991: Mother I've Been Kissed (Warner Music Norway)
1993: One Eye Open (WEA)
1994: Hugger Mugger (WEA)
2008: Judas Kiss (EMI Music)

With "Circulasione Totale Orchestra»
1996: Recycling Grieg (Circulasione Totale)
2000: Enten Eller (Circulasione Totale)

Within Wibutee
1998: Newborn Thing (Jazzland), feat. Live Maria Roggen
2001: Eight Domestic Challenges (Jazzland)

With Han Innante
1998: Radio Innante Presenterer: Han Innante – Magalaust (Kulturkompaniet/Radio Innante)

With Anne Grete Preus
1999: Verden Er Et Vakkert Sted (Virgin Music)

With Erik Faber
1999: Between The Lines (Sony Music)

With Nadirsenit
2003: Nadirsenit (Plateselskapet Skarv)

With Morten Abel
2003: Being Everything, Knowing Nothing (Virgin Music)

With Sigvart Dagsland
2004: Underlig Frihet (Capitol Records)

With "Dream Pilots»
2004: Walkover (MTG Music)
2005: If You Ever Come Down (MTG Music)

With Svein Tang Wa
2005: På Kanten (Trembling Records)

With Live Maria Roggen
2007: Circuit Songs (Jazzland Recordings)

With Hovering Orville
2008: Silverlines (Checkpoint Charlie)

References

External links 
Wee at Rockipedia.no

1969 births
Living people
Musicians from Sandnes
Norwegian rock bass guitarists
Norwegian jazz bass guitarists
Norwegian male bass guitarists
Male jazz musicians